The 2022 Kazakhstan Cup (known as the OLIMPBET Kazakhstan Cup for sponsorship reasons) is the 30th season of the Kazakhstan Cup, the annual nationwide football cup competition of Kazakhstan since the independence of the country. The winners will qualify for the 2023–24 UEFA Europa Conference League second qualifying round. FC Kairat are the defending champions, having beaten FC Shakhter Karagandy in the previous final.

Participating clubs 
The following teams entered the competition:

Format and schedule

Preliminary rounds 
Nine Kazakhstan First League clubs and seven Kazakhstan Second League clubs competed for two entries in the group stage.

First preliminary round

Second preliminary round

Third preliminary round

Group stage 
The 14 Kazakhstan Premier League clubs were drawn into four groups along with the two remaining teams from the preliminary rounds. The top two teams in each group advanced to the knockout stage.

Group A

Group B

Group C

Group D

Knockout stage 
The draw for the quarter-finals and semi-finals was held on 16 August 2022.

Quarter-finals

Semi-finals

Final

Goal scorers

8 goals:

  Toma Tabatadze - Akzhayik

6 goals:

  Pedro Eugénio - Astana 
  Abylayhan Zhumabek - Taraz

4 goals:

  Mamadou Diallo - Kaisar
  Ramazan Karimov - Maktaaral
  Luiz Guedes - Ordabasy
  Roman Murtazayev - Shakhter Karagandy
  Samir Fazli - Turan

3 goals:

  Vitaliy Balashov - Aktobe
  Illya Kovalenko - Akzhayik
  Jérémy Manzorro - Astana 
  Kiryl Sidarenka - Kaisar
  Galymzhan Kenzhebek - Maktaaral
  Elkhan Astanov - Ordabasy
  Maksim Fedin - Ordabasy
  Marat Shakhmetov - Taraz 
  Aybar Zhaksylykov - Tobol
  Nurbergen Nurbol - Zhetysu

2 goals:

  Erkebulan Amangeldy - Akademia Ontustik / Zhetysu
  Zaven Badoyan - Akzhayik
  Oralkhan Omirtayev - Akzhayik
  Artur Gazdanov - Akzhayik
  Yury Pertsukh - Astana 
  Vladislav Prokopenko - Astana 
  Rai Vloet - Astana 
  Matheus Bissi - Atyrau
  Andrija Filipović - Atyrau
  Ivan Pešić - Caspiy
  Yerkebulan Nurgaliyev - Caspiy
  João Paulo - Kairat
  Sergey Keiler - Kairat
  Artur Shushenachev - Kairat
  Vyacheslav Shvyryov - Kairat
  Gulzhigit Alykulov - Kairat
  Adilet Sadybekov - Kairat
  Orken Makhan - Kaisar
  Ruslan Sakhalbaev - Kaisar
  Vsevolod Sadovsky - Ordabasy
  Serge Nyuiadzi - Ordabasy
  Yevgeni Kobzar - Shakhter Karagandy
  Luka Gadrani - Taraz 
  Dinmukhamed Karaman - Taraz 
  Adilet Kenesbek - Taraz 
  Igor Sergeyev - Tobol
  Torekul - Zhas Sunkar
  Aleksey Mikhaylov - Zhetysu

1 goals:

  Daniyar Abilov - Akademia Ontustik
  Vadim Afanasenko - Akademia Ontustik
  Kudayberdy Narkulov - Akademia Ontustik
  Rinat Serikkul - Akademia Ontustik
  Arman Kenesov - Aktobe
  Temirlan Yerlanov - Aktobe
  Sergey Lisenkov - Aktobe City
  Damir Marat - Aksu
  Arman Smailov - Aksu
  Miras Turlybek - Aksu
  Petros Avetisyan - Akzhayik
  Rafael Sabino - Akzhayik
  Didar Esengeldy - Arys
  Keelan Lebon - Astana
  Abat Aymbetov - Astana
  Stanislav Basmanov - Astana
  Talgat Kusyapov - Astana
  Sultan Sagnayev - Astana
  Todor Petrović - Atyrau
  Piotr Grzelczak - Atyrau
  Baryskhan Isakhozhaev - Baikonur
  Ruan Teles - Caspiy
  Chafik Tigroudja - Caspiy
  Darkhan Berdibek - Caspiy
  Duman Narzildayev - Caspiy
  Pavel Kireyenko - Caspiy
  Artem Baranovskyi - Caspiy
  Ruslan Ordabek - Igilik
  Yerkebulan Seydakhmet - Kairat
  Andrey Ulshin - Kairat
  Daniyar Usenov - Kairat
  Viktor Vasin - Kairat
  João Pedro - Kaisar
  Elzhas Altynbekov - Kaisar
  Nurbol Anuarbekov - Kaisar
  Elisey Gorshunov - Kaisar
  Bekzat Kurmanbekuly - Kaisar
  Amal Seitov - Kaisar
  Elguja Lobjanidze - Kyzylzhar
  Maksim Chikanchi - Kyzylzhar
  Pavel Yakovlev - Kyzylzhar
  Alex Bruno - Maktaaral
  Beknur Ryskul - Maktaaral
  Ruslan Yudenkov - Maktaaral
  Murojon Khalmatov - Ordabasy
  Samat Shamshi - Ordabasy
  Karam Sultanov - Ordabasy
  Batyrbek Zhanabaev - SD Family Nur-Sultan
  Edin Rustemović - Shakhter Karagandy
  Roger Cañas - Shakhter Karagandy
  Ivan Graf - Shakhter Karagandy
  Shyngys Flyuk - Shakhter Karagandy
  Mikhail Gabyshev - Shakhter Karagandy
  Miram Sapanov - Shakhter Karagandy
  Ivan Sviridov - Shakhter Karagandy
  Toktar Zhangylyshbay - Shakhter Karagandy
  Alex Junior - Taraz
  Maksat Amirkhanov - Taraz
  Bauyrzhan Baytana - Taraz
  Zhakyp Kozhamberdy - Taraz
  Yermek Kuantayev - Taraz
  Dauren Zhumat - Taraz
  Bekzat Ermekbaev - Tobol
  Aleksandr Marochkin - Tobol
  Bekzat Kabylan - Turan
  Zhenis Abuov - Yassi
  Kanat Ashirbay - Yassi
  Abylay Zhaysanbek - Zhas Kyran
  Adilzhan Nurbay - Zhas Sunkar
  Altynbek Tuleev - Zhas Sunkar
  Sanzhar Batyrkhanov - Zhenis
  Artem Cheredinov - Zhenis
  Arsen Elemesov - Zhenis
  Nurzhan Kuanyshkaliev - Zhenis
  Karim Smykov - Zhenis
  Alikhan Uteshev - Zhenis
  Ravil Atykhanov - Zhetysu
  Bauyrzhan Turysbek - Zhetysu
  Aslanbek Sikoyev - Zhetysu

Own goal

References

External links 
 

2022
Cup
2022 domestic association football cups